(born September 14, 1986) is a Japanese singer and actress formerly associated with the Hello! Project and is best known as the leader of Morning Musume and Hello! Project until 2011. She is also a former member of its popular subgroup Mini Moni.

Biography

Morning Musume Career (2001–2011) 
In 2001, Ai Takahashi joined the Japanese idol group Morning Musume as part of the group's fifth generation of performers, along with Makoto Ogawa, Asami Konno, and Risa Niigaki. Her audition involved a three-day training camp where participants were expected to learn a new song, a dance routine and a script. Takahashi was one of nine applicants selected out of 25,000 for the camp. Her debut with the group was on their single "Mr. Moonlight: Ai no Big Band", and her first appearance on a Morning Musume full-length release was their fourth studio album, 4th Ikimasshoi!. Her first appearance within a Hello! Project shuffle unit release was on the 2002 single "Shiawase Beam! Suki Suki Beam!" under the group name Happy 7.

In 2003, Takahashi replaced Mari Yaguchi in the Morning Musume spinoff group Mini Moni and debuted in the group's movie Mini Moni ja Movie: Okashi na Daibōken! and its accompanying soundtrack. Later in 2003, she was part of the Morning Musume splinter group Morning Musume Sakuragumi, which performed mainly slower numbers on the group's two EPs, "Hare Ame Nochi Suki" and "Sakura Mankai", and the shuffle group 7Air, an R&B-inspired septet.

Takahashi's vocals became more prominent on the second and final Mini Moni album, Mini Moni Songs 2 (2004), as well as on Morning Musume's singles from their spring 2004 release, "Roman: My Dear Boy". She sang a duet with Tsunku on the cover version of Tsunku and Ayumi Hamasaki's duet "Love: Since 1999" and on his solo album Take1.

In 2005, Morning Musume's first single release of the year, "The Manpower!!!", featured Takahashi in a prominent co-lead-vocal role which she has continued in on subsequent singles. That summer she became part of the 2005 shuffle group Elegies.

In 2006, Takahashi played the lead role, Sapphire, in Ribon no Kishi The Musical which was a collaboration work by Hello! Project and the Japanese all-female theatrical company Takarazuka Revue. The musical was based on Tezuka Osamu's manga and starred v-u-den, Nozomi Tsuji, Aya Matsuura and Natsumi Abe as well as Marcia and Kaoru Ebira of the Takarazuka Revue. On July 2, Takahashi released her first and only solo single to date, "Yume Kara Samete".

Following then-leader Hitomi Yoshizawa's graduation from Morning Musume on May 6, 2007, sub-leader Miki Fujimoto was promoted to leader and Takahashi filled in as the new sub-leader of the group. On June 1, 2007, Fujimoto resigned and Takahashi took over as the new leader.

Takahashi was also captain of the Hello! Project kickball team, Metro Rabbits H.P.

In 2008, Takahashi became a member of Hello Project's new unit High-King, a group created to promote Morning Musume's Cinderella the Musical, in which Takahashi played the title character.

It was announced in July 2008 that Takahashi and fellow Morning Musume member Risa Niigaki would play the 80s J-Pop duo Pink Lady in the TV Drama Hitmaker Aku Yuu Monogatari.

As of January 2009, she and Risa Niigaki had the longest tenures of any member; she was one of only seven members to remain in the group for seven years or more (the others being Kaori Iida, Yoshizawa, Niigaki, Eri Kamei, Sayumi Michishige and Reina Tanaka) and one of two (along with Niigaki) to remain in the group for eight or nine years.

On February 1, 2009, during the "Hello Pro Award '09 ~Elder Club Sotsugyō Kinen Special~" concert held at Yokohama Arena, Yuko Nakazawa passed on her leadership position in Hello! Project to Takahashi.

In December 2009, Takahashi was one of many celebrities to promote the release of Final Fantasy XIII in Japan.

In September 2010, she became the second Morning Musume member to be at least 24 years old and the first to reach that age while in the group (original member Yuko Nakazawa was 24 when the group was formed).

On January 9, 2011, it was announced that Takahashi would graduate from Morning Musume at the end of the fall tour that year.

Takahashi's last single with Morning Musume, the double A-side "Kono Chikyuu no Heiwa wo Honki de Negatterun dayo!/ Kare to Issho ni Omise ga Shitai" (この地球の平和を本気で願ってるんだよ！/彼と一緒にお店がしたい！), included a B-side solo by Takahashi, "Jishin Motte Yume o Motte Tobitatsu Kara" (自信持って 夢を持って 飛び立つから), and was released on her birthday, September 14.

On September 30, 2011, on the last day of Morning Musume's "Ai Believe" tour, Takahashi graduated from Morning Musume and Hello! Project at the Nippon Budokan and passed her role of leader to Risa Niigaki.

Post Morning Musume (2011–present)
2011Her first role after graduation was the lead role of Sarah in the musical Dance of the Vampires at the Imperial Garden Theater. On November 25, it was announced that Takahashi was cast for a stage play titled La Patisserie, which ran from March 3 to March 11 in Tokyo, March 20 in Osaka, and March 22 in Ishikawa.

2012On May 6, Takahashi announced that she had been cast in the Taiga drama Taira no Kiyomori. She played Tsuneko, the wife of Kiyomori's eldest son. From September 12 to September 23, she starred in a stage play titled High School Uta Gekidan☆Otoko-gumi. It was announced that Takahashi would voice a character in the hit anime series Detective Conan, with her episodes airing in early 2013.

2013On February 12, Hello! Project Fanclub News announced that Takahashi would star in a stage play titled Moshimo Kokumin ga Shusho o Erandara along with Rika Ishikawa, S/mileage members Ayaka Wada and Kanon Fukuda, and Juice=Juice  members Karin Miyamoto and Akari Uemura. The play ran for 11 performances from April 24 to April 30. On March 18, Takahashi appeared in the commercial “Ai to Kumao” to promote the insect repellent Mushuda; it was her first time appearing solo in a commercial. On May 10, Takahashi modeled for the Vanquish Venus fashion magazine. On July 3, it was announced that she would be going to Thailand for Japan Festa 2013 from August 31 to September 1. She held a free mini live and handshake event. On July 16, she announced two live birthday concerts to be held on September 14 (Tokyo) and 16 (Osaka), titled called "Ai Takahashi Birthday Live 2013 ~HELLO♥27~", but the Osaka performance was cancelled due to a typhoon. On July 21, Takahashi held a live solo performance titled "Takahashi Ai Sparkling Live in Yuigahama". On September 10, HMV announced that Takahashi would be releasing her first style book on October 18, titled "AI am I", which would include an interview about her Morning Musume days, as well as her ideas about love. It would also include articles on fashion, hair tips, and makeup. Takahashi became a regular on the new TV drama Jikken Keiji Totori 2, which began airing on October 12. In November, Takahashi was cast in the musical Merrily We Roll Along. From late October to November, Takahashi began filming for the movie Kara-age☆USA, starring in the main role. The movie was filmed in Oita, Japan and in the United States.

2014On March 17, Takahashi appeared in another commercial for the insect repellent Mushuda, titled "Live." In September, her film Kara-age☆USA was released in theaters. On September 13, Takahashi released her second style book I have AI.

2015Takahashi attended "Hello Pro Kenshuusei Happyoukai 2015 ~Haru no Koukai Jitsuryoku Shindan Test~" as a judge. In April, it was announced that she had joined a girl group with fellow Morning Musume graduates Yaguchi Mari and Tsuji Nozomi called "Datsumo Musume", under the management of Datsumo Labo, for the promotion of their hair removal services. On July 17, the women's lingerie and clothing retailer PEACH JOHN announced they would be collaborating with Takahashi for the collection "LOVE & PEACH". On September 11, it was announced that Takahashi would be collaborating with fashion brand Haco for the LOVE&PEACE Project 2015, a project that began in the wake of the 9/11 attacks to raise funds to support "a happy future for children around the world" by selling clothing from the project collection. On October 2, Takahashi modeled for a new boot collection by ASBee.

2016In spring 2016, Takahashi starred in Hoshi Boshi no Yakusoku, Japan's first live-action film made for a Fulldome Cinema, which was screened in her hometown's Fukui City Museum of Natural History Dome Theater.

Personal life
On December 20, 2013, Takahashi was announced to have become engaged to her boyfriend, Koji Abe, and they married on February 14, 2014. On June 2, 2014, they held a wedding ceremony in Hawaii, attended by 30 friends and family. Takahashi and Abe held their wedding party on January 22, 2015, with Morning Musume members including Kei Yasuda, Rika Ishikawa, Hitomi Yoshizawa, Makoto Ogawa, Asami Konno, Miki Fujimoto, Mizuki Fukumura, Erina Ikuta, Riho Sayashi, and many others in attendance.

Discography and releases

Studio Albums

Singles

Photo and fashion books

DVDs

Acts

Television dramas

Television shows

Radio

References

External links 

 Official Blog
 Morning Musume: Official Hello! Project profile 
 モーニング娘。『卒業直前の高橋愛が 後輩たちへ託す想いを涙ながらに語る』 (Oricon interview with Ai Takahashi, September 12, 2011) 

7Air members
1986 births
Elegies (group) members
Happy 7 members
Japanese female idols
Japanese female models
Japanese actresses
21st-century Japanese women singers
21st-century Japanese singers
Japanese child singers
Japanese child actresses
Living people
Minimoni members
Morning Musume members
Actors from Fukui Prefecture
Musicians from Fukui Prefecture
People from Sakai, Fukui